Baxter is an unincorporated community in Pueblo County, in the U.S. state of Colorado.

The community has the name of O. H. P. Baxter, a local settler.

References

Unincorporated communities in Pueblo County, Colorado
Unincorporated communities in Colorado